The Bolivarian Circles are political and social organizations of workers' councils in Venezuela, originally created by President Hugo Chávez on 21 December 2001. The circles have also been described as militias and compared to Cuba's Committees for the Defense of the Revolution and Panama's Dignity Battalions.

Following the involvement of Bolivarian Circles in defending President Chávez during the 2002 Venezuelan coup d'état attempt, the government sponsored the creation of official communal councils on 10 April 2006, many of which became armed colectivos instead.

Background 
In April 2001, President Hugo Chávez tasked then-Vice President Diosdado Cabello and Miguel Rodríguez Torres to create and finance community organizations that would share local interests to Chávez so his government could lend resources and gain political support. Such support from the government made Chávez's opponents skeptical of any claims of autonomy. They are named in honor of Simón Bolívar, the leader who transformed most of South America from Spanish colonial outposts to the independent states now in place.

The circles were created as state-sanctioned groups that were to be the "principle organizing unit of popular power" and were announced by Chávez as "a great human network" that was created to defend the Bolivarian Revolution. Some circles were modeled after the Dignity Battalions that were created by Omar Torríjos and Manuel Noriega in Panama since Chávez admired the model when stationed there during his military career. The founding documents of Venezuela's Bolivarian Circles state that "the Supreme leader of Bolivarian Circles will be the President of the Bolivarian Republic of Venezuela" and that "the national and international headquarters for the registration of Bolivarian Circles will be the Palace of Miraflores".

Many of the Bolivarian Circles were given combat training and weapons, with some of their leaders being trained in Cuba. According to Lina Ron, a Chávez supporter and head of her own Bolivarian Circle, La Piedrita, thousands of circles deeply loyal to Chávez were "armed to the teeth". Chávez denied allegations of funding and the circles use of weapons.

History 
In January 2002, Bolivarian Circles were reported to have blocked the entrance of the newspaper office El Nacional for over an hour. Numerous journalists have been threatened, berated, and abused physically and verbally, particularly by people that identified with the Bolivarian Circles.

Bolivarian Circles also took part in demonstrations that became violent against the 2002 coup attempt. Shortly after the coup attempt in a May 2002 cable from the US Embassy in Caracas, there were concerned reports of members of Bolivarian Circles receiving new motorcycles, Nike brand clothing and that members of the Bolivarian Circles became armed, causing panic in neighborhoods. Numbers of Bolivarian Circles also increased significantly that month according to Diosdado Cabello, with number rising from 80,000 to 130,000.

According to private intelligence agency company Stratfor, Bolivarian Circles were also the parent organization of colectivos in Venezuela.

Oath 
In 2001, Chávez swore in all official Bolivarian Circles at the first national reunion under the following oath, which was adapted from Bolívar's own oath on the hill of Monte Sacro in 1805:

{|style="border:1px; border: none; background-color:#f0f6fa; margin:20px;" cellpadding="10"
|-
|
I swear in front of you, for the God of my parents; I swear for them. I swear for my honor and for my motherland that I will not rest my arms nor my soul until we have broken, finally, the chains that oppress Venezuela as an inheritance of the powerful who destroyed the motherland. I swear that I will completely dedicate my work to the Bolivarian ideology, to the popular organization, to popular mobilization, to popular power, to never abandon the struggle; every day and every night that I have left with the Bolivarian circles in the Bolivarian web, in the Bolivarian current, in the Bolivarian forces and in the Revolutionary Bolivarian Movement 200 that today is born again after 19 years, by the will of the Venezuelan people. I swear that I will fight without rest for the defense of the revolution, even if I have to sacrifice my life, for the glory of Venezuela. I swear that we will consolidate forever the Bolivarian revolution and the motherland of our children. I swear.
|}

See also
Colectivo (Venezuela)
Revolución Bolivariana
Venezuelan Communal Councils

Notes

External links
http://www.cybercircle.org

Bolivarian Revolution
Propaganda in Venezuela
Organizations based in Venezuela